The 1972 Chicago White Sox season was the White Sox's 73rd season overall, and 72nd in the American League. They finished with a record of 87–67, good enough for second place in the American League West, 5½ games behind the first-place Oakland Athletics.

Offseason 
 October 22, 1971: Lowell Palmer was purchased by the White Sox from the Philadelphia Phillies.
 December 2, 1971: Tommy John and Steve Huntz were traded by the White Sox to the Los Angeles Dodgers for Dick Allen.
 December 2, 1971: Rich McKinney was traded by the White Sox by the New York Yankees for Stan Bahnsen.
 December 14, 1971: Pat Jacquez was traded by the White Sox to the Cincinnati Reds for Jim Qualls.

Regular season 
 July 31, 1972: Dick Allen hit two inside-the-park home runs in one game against the Minnesota Twins.

Season standings

Record vs. opponents

Opening Day lineup 
 Walt Williams, RF
 Mike Andrews, 2B
 Dick Allen, 1B
 Bill Melton, 3B
 Carlos May, LF
 Rick Reichardt, CF
 Ed Herrmann, C
 Luis Alvarado, SS
 Wilbur Wood, P

Notable transactions 
 May 16, 1972: Lowell Palmer was released by the White Sox.
 June 6, 1972: Nyls Nyman was drafted by the White Sox in the 16th round of the 1972 Major League Baseball draft.
 June 16, 1972: Jim Qualls was released by the White Sox.
 August 17, 1972: Eddie Fisher was traded by the California Angels to the Chicago White Sox for a player to be named later and Bruce Miller. The Chicago White Sox sent Bruce Kimm (September 1, 1972) to the California Angels to complete the trade.
 September 1, 1972: Hank Allen was signed as a free agent by the White Sox.

Roster

Player stats

Batting 
Note: G = Games played; AB = At bats; R = Runs scored; H = Hits; 2B = Doubles; 3B = Triples; HR = Home runs; RBI = Runs batted in; BB = Base on balls; SO = Strikeouts; AVG = Batting average; SB = Stolen bases

Pitching 
Note: W = Wins; L = Losses; ERA = Earned run average; G = Games pitched; GS = Games started; SV = Saves; IP = Innings pitched; H = Hits allowed; R = Runs allowed; ER = Earned runs allowed; HR = Home runs allowed; BB = Walks allowed; K = Strikeouts

Farm system

Notes

References 
 
 1972 Chicago White Sox at Baseball Reference

Chicago White Sox seasons
Chicago White Sox season
Chicago